Pleebo (or Plibo) is a city located in Maryland County, Liberia. It is the largest city in Maryland County with a population of 22,693 in 2008.

References

Populated places in Liberia
Maryland County